Lisbon is the fifth studio album by the New York-based group The Walkmen. It was released on September 14, 2010, in the US. John Congleton produced and engineered the album. The band recorded nearly thirty tracks before settling on the eleven that comprise the album. The album is a tribute to the city of Lisbon in Portugal.

Exclaim! named Lisbon as the No. 13 Pop & Rock Album of 2010. Pitchfork named it the No. 21 in their Top 50 Albums of 2010.

By 2011, it had sold 39,159 copies in United States according to Nielsen SoundScan.

Track listing

Personnel
Credits adapted from AllMusic.

Band
Matt Barrick – drums 
Peter Bauer – organ, piano
Walter Martin – bass guitar, percussion
Hamilton Leithauser – guitar, vocals
Paul Maroon – guitar, trumpet, viola

Additional musicians
Alec Ounsworth – vocals
Greg Glassman – trumpet
Rachel Golub – violin
Clara Kennedy – cello
John Kozan – trombone
Dana Lyn – violin
Anna Stumpf – trumpet
Kenny Warren – trumpet
Alex Waterman – cello, transcription
Mike Irwin – trumpet
Kevin Moehringer– trombone
Leyna Papach – violin
Paul Brandenburg – trumpet
Joe Ancowitz – trumpet

Production
Greg Calbi – mastering
John Congleton – engineer, mixing, producer
Mark Endozo – assistant engineer
Luigi Ghirri – cover photo
Fred Maroon –inside photo
Alex Aldi – second engineer
Elizabeth Spiridakis – design
Chris Zane – engineer, mixing

References

The Walkmen albums
2010 albums
Albums produced by John Congleton